Corynoline is an acetylcholinesterase inhibitor isolated from Corydalis incisa.

References

Acetylcholinesterase inhibitors
Isoquinoline alkaloids
Quinoline alkaloids
Heterocyclic compounds with 6 rings
Benzodioxoles